The 2016 Western Michigan Broncos football team represented Western Michigan University (WMU) in the 2016 NCAA Division I FBS football season. They were led by fourth-year head coach P. J. Fleck and played their home games at Waldo Stadium as a member of the West Division of the Mid-American Conference (MAC). The Broncos completed their regular season undefeated and won the MAC West Division title. The Broncos finished conference play defeating the Ohio Bobcats 29–23 in the 2016 MAC Championship Game, winning the school's first MAC championship title since 1988. WMU received an invitation to the 2017 Cotton Bowl as the highest rated Group of Five team in the College Football Playoff (CFP). It was the first major-bowl appearance in school history (and second for a MAC team). The Broncos also won 10 games in a season for the first time in their 111-year football history. They lost to the No. 8 Wisconsin Badgers in the New Years Six bowl game, 24–16.

WMU received its first national top 25 ranking after they beat rival Central Michigan and was No. 25 in the Coaches Poll. Following its first win over Northern Illinois since 2008, the Broncos were ranked in the AP Top 25 for the first time in school history at No. 24 in week seven. The Broncos debuted in the CFP poll at No. 23. They finished the regular season ranked 18th in the Coaches Poll and 15th in the AP Poll.

Previous season
In 2015, the Broncos finished the season 8–5 overall and 6–2 in MAC play to finish in a three-way tie for first in the West Division. Due to tiebreakers, they did not qualify for the conference championship game. They were invited to the Bahamas Bowl where they defeated Middle Tennessee.

Schedule
The following table lists WMU schedule.

Coaching staff
The following table lists the team's coaching staff.

Roster

Season

Home invasion arrests
During the week leading up to the opening game, two freshmen, Ron George and Bryson White, were arraigned on charges of "armed robbery, first-degree home invasion and larceny from a building." The police allege that they used a gun and a knife to rob a woman.

White was already facing criminal charges in Ohio related to  driving under the influence of marijuana and driving on a suspended license. A passenger in his car was charged with carrying a gun and White refused to cooperate when asked about it.

The players were dismissed from the team.

All-Americans 

Taylor Moton was named to the Football Writers' Association of America All-American second team.

Corey Davis was named as a first team All-American by the Associated Press, the FWAA, and the American Football Coaches Association, earning him honors as the school's first "consensus" All-American. He earned second team honors from The Sporting News and the Walter Camp Football Foundation.

Campbell Trophy 

For his classroom exploits that include a 4.0 GPA in his Masters' program, quarterback Zach Terrell won the prestigious Campbell Trophy, known as the "academic Heisman."

National Football Foundation 

Zach Terrell was chosen as a scholar athlete by the National Football Foundation as one of 12 athletes across all four (FBS, FCS, II, III) divisions of college football to receive an $18,000 post-graduate scholarship.

Conference Players of the Week

Robert Spillane
Spillane was named MAC West Defensive Player of the Week for his week one performance in the team's 22–21 win at Northwestern in which he collected seven tackles and forced a fumble. Spillane later earned Co-Defensive Player of the Week honors in the Broncos' week three win at Illinois in which he made 11 tackles and snagged his first career interception. Spillane later earned DPOW honors with 14 tackles in the Broncos' 45–31 win over Eastern Michigan in week eight. In the Broncos' 37–21 win over Kent State, Spillane recorded a crucial safety that resulted in week ten honors.

Darius Phillips
Phillips was named MAC West Special Teams Player of the Week for his week two performance against North Carolina Central that included a 66-yard punt return touchdown. Phillips' standout performance that included a 100-yard kick return touchdown in week four against Georgia Southern earned him STPOW honors in week five.

Jamauri Bogan
Bogan earned honors as MAC West Co-Offensive Player of the Week for his 189 rushing yards and two touchdowns at Illinois in week three.

Zach Terrell
Terrell became the week four MAC West Offensive Player of the Week for his 270 yards passing and four touchdowns in the Broncos' 49–31 win over Georgia Southern. Terrell would garner honors again for his 445-yard passing performance in the Broncos' 38–0 rout of Buffalo.

Corey Davis
Senior wide receiver Corey Davis had six receptions for 72 yards and two touchdowns against rival Central Michigan earned him week five MAC West Offensive Player of the Week honors as he passed former Bronco  Jordan White for the conference record for career receiving yards. Davis would snag honors again with a 12-reception, 272-yard receiving effort that included three touchdowns against Ball State.

Jarvion Franklin
The 2014 MAC Offensive Player of the Year and MAC Freshman of the Year received honors as MAC West Offensive Player of the Week after the Broncos' 45–30 win over Northern Illinois in week six during which he tallied 249 all-purpose yards (169 rushing and 80 receiving) with a receiving touchdown and a rushing touchdown (both on fourth down plays) to help buoy WMU's offensive efforts. Later, in week seven at Akron, Franklin again earned MAC West honors as he set the school record for single game rushing with 281 yards on 33 attempts in the Broncos' 41–0 win over the Zips.

Caleb Bailey
Bailey collected seven tackles (including 2.5 tackles for loss) and an interception in the Broncos' 41–0 victory at Akron to earn week seven honors as MAC West Defensive Player of the Week.

Asantay Brown
Brown tallied six tackles, including one for loss, and an interception return for a touchdown in the Broncos' 55–35 rout of Toledo in week 13, earning him honors as MAC West Defensive Player of the Week.

Scholar Athletes of the Week

Zach Terrell
Terrell earned honors as Scholar Athlete of the Week for the week of Oct. 3–10 for his performance in the Broncos' 45–30 win over Northern Illinois on Oct. 8. He completed 18 of 24 passes for 327 yards and accounted for four touchdowns total (three passing, one rushing) in the first Western Michigan victory over the Huskies since 2008. Terrell boasted a 4.0 GPA in his Master's of Business Administration program and completed his undergraduate degree in finance earlier in 2016 with a GPA of 3.66.

Taylor Moton
Moton earned honors as Scholar Athlete of the Week for the week of Nov. 14–21 for his performance in the Broncos' 37–21 win over Kent State as he helped buoy an effort of 329 rushing yards against the Golden Flashes on national television. Moton spent most of the year rated at No. 1 on the Schneider Scale, which is used to determine the Outland Trophy winner (best offensive lineman not playing center).

Distinguished Scholar Athletes

On December 27, 2016, the Mid-American Conference named seven Broncos as Distinguished Scholar Athletes:

 Lucas Bezerra (TE) 3.71 GPA
 Kasey Carson (LB) 3.58 GPA
 John Keenoy (OL) 3.7 GPA
 Taylor Moton (OL) 3.28 GPA
 Trevor Sweeney (WR) 3.77 GPA
 Zach Terrell (QB) 4.0 GPA
 Justin Tranquill (DB) 3.85 GPA

Academic All-Conference

Sixteen players from the team were named to the Academic All-Conference team: Lucas Bezzera, Kasey Carson, Lucas Cherocci, David Curle, Alex Grace, Austin Guido, Luke Juriga, John Keenoy, Odell Miller, Derek Mitchell, Taylor Moton, Zach Novoselsky, Giovanni Ricci, Trevor Sweeney, Zach Terrell and Justin Tranquill.

Rankings

After winning their first two games against Northwestern and North Carolina Central, WMU received 1 vote in the Coaches Poll. Their road win against Illinois moved the Broncos to 3–0 where they received 6 votes in the AP Poll and 16 votes in the Coaches Poll. WMU received their first Top 25 ranking in program history after they defeated rival Central Michigan and moved to 5–0.

The table below shows the week-by-week status of WMU in the college football polls.

Game summaries

Northwestern
Source

Western Michigan withstood a three-touchdown effort from Northwestern running back Justin Jackson and used a late Jamauri Bogan touchdown to win its season opener in Evanston. The Broncos recovered a fumble late in the game that was upheld on video review. It marked the Broncos' first win over a Big Ten school since 2008.

North Carolina Central
Source

Seven different Western Michigan players scored touchdowns in the Broncos' home-opening 70–21 win over Division I FCS opponent North Carolina Central.

Illinois

Running back Jamauri Bogan scored two rushing touchdowns and kicker Butch Hampton booted two field goals to lift the Broncos to victory over their second Big Ten opponent of the season. It was the first win over Illinois since 2008.

Georgia Southern
Source

Darius Phillips' kickoff return touchdown and interception return touchdown helped stake the Broncos to a 42–17 lead as they eventually held on to win, 49–31, over non-conference opponent Georgia Southern.

Central Michigan
Source

Western Michigan used a fast start that resulted in a 21–3 halftime lead to defeat the arch-rival Chippewas in Mount Pleasant, 49–10. The victory gave the Broncos their third straight victory in the series, their fifth victory in the past six meetings, and their third consecutive victory in Mount Pleasant (2012, 2014, 2016) after only having won there in 1965, 1970, 1973, and 2002 since WMU went Division I in 1962.

Northern Illinois
Source

Western Michigan beat Northern Illinois 45–30, to improve their record to 6–0 (2–0 MAC).  With the win, the Broncos had beaten all three Illinois FBS teams in the same season—Northwestern, Illinois, and Northern Illinois.

Akron
Source

Western Michigan's first match-up against the Zips since 2011 was again a one-sided contest as the Broncos raced out to a 27–0 halftime lead en route to a 41–0 win over the East Division-leading Akron Zips. Corey Davis caught two touchdown passes and Jarvion Franklin set the school record for single game rushing with 281 yards on 33 attempts. Franklin added an 18-yard pass reception, giving him 299 all-purpose yards in the victory. Linebackers Caleb Bailey and Kasey Carson collected interceptions to help preserve the shutout.

Eastern Michigan
Source

Zach Terrell threw three touchdowns, two of them to Carrington Thompson, and for 398 yards as the Broncos held off a game Eastern Michigan team that would eventually qualify for its first bowl game since 1987.

Ball State
Source

Corey Davis had a big game on national television with 12 receptions for 272 yards and three scores as the Broncos raced out to a 28–10 halftime lead and went on to win, 52–20.

Kent State
Source

Fabian Johnson rushed for a career-high 125 yards as the Broncos had to rally from a 14–0 deficit on the road to win, 37–21, at Dix Stadium, in a rainy Election Day contest on national television.

Buffalo
Source

Zach Terrell was the hero again for the Broncos, as he shredded the Bulls' defense for 445 yards passing in a 38–0 rout that was preceded by a visit from  College Gameday for the first time in school history.

Toledo
Source

Linebacker Asantay Brown scored on the game's first play from scrimmage with an interception return for a touchdown and Jamauri Bogan returned to form with 31 carries for 198 yards and a touchdown as the Broncos routed Toledo, 55–35, for the MAC West divisional title. Corey Davis also broke the Division I FBS career receiving yardage record in the win.

Ohio (MAC Championship Game)
Source

Kicker Butch Hampton booted five field goals and linebacker Robert Spillane intercepted Ohio quarterback Greg Windham with 51 seconds remaining to deliver the first MAC championship to Kalamazoo since 1988. The Broncos finished the regular season 13–0 for the first time in school history with the victory.

Wisconsin (81st Cotton Bowl Classic)
Source

The only blemish on Western Michigan's 2016 campaign came in the postseason as Dare Ogunbowale, Corey Clement, and Troy Fumagalli scored touchdowns for Wisconsin in a 24–16 defeat for the Broncos. Zach Terrell threw for a touchdown and ran for another in his final collegiate game. The touchdown pass went to Corey Davis, playing in his final collegiate game, as well.

References

Western Michigan
Western Michigan Broncos football seasons
Mid-American Conference football champion seasons
Western Michigan Broncos football